Cinna bolanderi is a species of grass known by the common names Bolander's woodreed and Sierran woodreed. It is endemic to the Sierra Nevada of California, where it grows in meadows and forest, especially in moist areas. It can reach two meters in height and has a spreading inflorescence of spikelets. It blooms in late summer and fall.

References

External links
Jepson Manual Treatment
USDA Plants Profile
Grass Manual Treatment
Photo gallery

Pooideae
Native grasses of California
Endemic flora of California
Flora of the Sierra Nevada (United States)
Plants described in 1884